Melindea brunnea is a species of leaf beetle of Zimbabwe and the Democratic Republic of the Congo. It was first described from Harare by Martin Jacoby in 1901.

References 

Eumolpinae
Beetles of the Democratic Republic of the Congo
Taxa named by Martin Jacoby
Beetles described in 1901
Insects of Zimbabwe